Latitude Hill is a hill in the Great Victoria Desert, Western Australia. It is the location of a mining tenement named "Latitude Hill (Musgrave)", owned by Integra Mining.

References

Goldfields-Esperance